Huey's Cooking Adventures is an Australian television series featuring chef Iain Hewitson.
It screened at daytime on Monday to Friday throughout its run on Network Ten, including most recently at 4:00pm. It also airs on the subscription television channel Lifestyle Food, through Foxtel, Austar and Optus Television. The show began airing in 1997 on the Seven Network, before defecting to Ten soon after where the show has found popularity with daytime audiences. The program was replaced with a new, albeit similar, series Huey's Kitchen from March 2010.

Synopsis
The show ran for half an hour, with Iain Hewitson often cooking "away from home" using local produce and ingredients. The show provides modern food as well as classics with a "Huey" influence. He's also known for throwing in his stories and jokes.

Sponsors
In later seasons, major sponsors had a larger focus in the program, including an advertorial before the conclusion of each episode. These sponsors included:
 Campbell's Real Stock
 Viva Papertowels
 Kikkoman
 McKenzie's
 Chemist Warehouse
 Bi-Lo

See also
 List of Australian television series

References

External links
 Official Website
 Official Page by Channel Ten

Seven Network original programming
Network 10 original programming
Australian cooking television series
1997 Australian television series debuts
2010 Australian television series endings
2000s Australian television series